Huairou–Miyun Line of Beijing Suburban Railway (BCR), or Huaimi Line, is a commuter rail line in Beijing.

It provides faster service to reach Beijing's two suburban districts, Huairou District and Miyun District from central Beijing.

History
Changping North and Huairou North started the Huairou–Miyun line service on 31 December 2017. Yanqihu, Heishansi and Gubeikou started the Huairou–Miyun line service on April 30, 2019. From August 1, 2020 to August 20, 2020, the whole line stopped service for the Beijing–Tongliao railway electrification project. Beijing North started the Huairou–Miyun line service on September 30, 2020.

Station

Ticket 

The ticket pricing of the Huairou-Miyun Line is the same as that of the Beijing Subway network. For example, the ticket price of Qinghe - Gubeikou is 12 CNY. Special half-price ticket of children and disabled soldiers is sold on the 12306 website, 12306 mobile application and in all railway ticket offices.  Users of Beijing Suburban Railway Card and users of the Yitongxing mobile app enjoy the same preferential policy of Beijing Subway accumulated consumption discount. Passengers have to purchase a ticket and get in the station after verifying identity documents if they purchase the tickets online or in the ticket offices.  Passengers do not need to seat in number. Passengers can pay the fare by Beijing Suburban Railway Card, QR code generated by Yitongxing mobile app, an online-purchased ticket or in all China Railway ticket offices by cash, bank card, WeChat Pay or Alipay. Passengers have to swipe the traffic card or document of identification (if the ticket was purchased online) or scan the QR code while entering and leaving the stations.

Notes

Railway lines in China
Rail transport in Beijing
Railway lines opened in 2017
Standard gauge railways in China